Callus is an area of toughened skin.

Callus may also refer to:

Fibrocartilage callus, the temporary new bony tissue that forms at the ends of a fractured bone
Callus (botany), a fleshy lump of tissue on the labellum (or lip) of orchid flowers
Callus (cell biology), a mass of unorganized cells 
Callus (mollusc), a thickened layer of shell material
Callus (album), a 2016 album by Gonjasufi

See also
 Calus (disambiguation)
 Thick skin (disambiguation)
 Callous, a trait where a person lacks empathy, or at least ignores it; hardhearted